Madara Mālmane (born 1989) is Latvian model.

She has been on the cover of Italian magazine Grazia in 2003 and 2005. Mālmane has photos taken for magazines L'Officiel, Vogue, Elle, Marie Claire, Numéro, W, Vanity Fair, and Jalouse. She graduated Rīgas Hanzas vidusskola. She is currently in a relationship with Latvian singer Dons.

References 

1989 births
Living people
Latvian female models
Models from Riga